Amos Palmer House is a historic farmhouse located in Lower Makefield Township, Bucks County, Pennsylvania. The original section was built about 1760, and is a two-story, double pile brick structure on a stone foundation.  The house subsequently had four additions: a -story, single pile stone structure built about 1810; a -story, stone and rubble structure and frame shed roofed kitchen added about 1870; a two-story, frame kitchen addition built about 1900; and a small frame shed dated between about 1940 and 1980.  The house is in the Georgian style.

It was added to the National Register of Historic Places in 1988.

References

External links
 Kirkbride-Palmer House, 559 Palmer Farm Drive (Lower Makefield Township), Yardley, Bucks County, PA: 4 photos, 2 data pages, and 1 photo caption page at Historic American Buildings Survey

Historic American Buildings Survey in Pennsylvania
Houses on the National Register of Historic Places in Pennsylvania
Georgian architecture in Pennsylvania
Houses completed in 1980
Houses in Bucks County, Pennsylvania
National Register of Historic Places in Bucks County, Pennsylvania